Pascale Audret (12 October 1935, Neuilly-sur-Seine – 17 July 2000) was a French actress who was most active during the 1950s through the 1960s.

Career
While she starred in over 25 films between 1955 and 1968, her success never crossed over internationally. Her career in film, television, stage and music stayed in France. One of her most high-profile films came when she starred opposite Orson Welles in the 1961 film La Fayette. The following year she starred in Give Me Ten Desperate Men, which was entered into the 12th Berlin International Film Festival.

Personal life
Audret was born as Pascale Aiguionne Louise Jacqueline Marie Auffray to Henry Auffray, an industrialist, and Amyelle de Caubios d'Andiran, a musician, second cousin of the French author François Mauriac (respectively by their maternal grandfather and maternal grandmother). Her brother is singer Hugues Aufray.

Audret was married twice, first to actor Roger Coggio and later to music producer Francis Dreyfus. It was her second marriage that produced her daughter Julie Dreyfus, an actress who co-starred in Quentin Tarantino's Kill Bill & Inglourious Basterds. Audret put her career on the back burner after the birth of her daughter Julie in 1966.

Death
Audret died in a road accident in 2000, aged 64. She was in the passenger seat of a car being driven by her companion.

Selected filmography
 Mannequins of Paris (1956)
 Dialogue with the Carmelites (1960)
 Give Me Ten Desperate Men (1961)
 Spotlight on a Murderer (1962)
 A Man in His Prime (1964)
 Countdown to Doomsday (1966)
 Oh God, Women Are So Loving (1994)

References

External links

1935 births
2000 deaths
People from Neuilly-sur-Seine
French film actresses
French television actresses
French stage actresses
Road incident deaths in France
20th-century French actresses